Polo Montañez (June 5, 1955 - November 26, 2002) was a Cuban singer and songwriter.

Early life
Montañez was born Fernando Borrego Linares in Sierra del Rosario, Pinar del Río, on a farm known as El Brujito. At an early age he worked various jobs including driving a tractor, milking cows, making charcoal, assisting on the family farm, and as a lumberjack. In his spare time, Montañez would go from house to house singing. He began to sing and play in local parties and family gatherings with his father. In those gatherings, he started playing the tumbadora and the guitar at age 7.

From Anonymity to International Fame

He started to manage a group that played in touristic areas of La Cordillera de los Órganos. He lived in la Cañada del Infierno, Casa Blanca, Finca del Cusco, and in 1972 he occupied one of the houses in the touristic community of Las Terrazas. He composed his first song in 1973, titled "Este tiempo feliz" (This happy time), after that he continued creating, but he stored his songs in a drawer because he didn't consider them valuable.

In around 1994 when the Complejo Las Terrazas was founded, Polo and his own ensemble of sort started playing at its different touristic installations, like Hotel Moka, Rancho Curujey and Cafetal Buenavista. Between those tasks, he met a Lusafrica European label owner and in 1999 signed a contract to make a few records. From there his first album "Guajiro Natural" and the song "Un montón de Estrellas" were born. In Colombia it sold more than 40,000 copies, obtaining Gold and Platinum status, and he was recognized as the most listened to international artist. He became known as the Guajiro Natural (Natural Countryman) because of his humble personality and songs about peasant life in Cuba.

At age 44 he had more than 70 songs written as an autodidact. He had no professional training nor musical knowledge, apart from listening the countryside sounds. He composed in a mix of genres, making use of rhythms he heard and knew. He developed his own style with themes about outside or personal events, impregnated with rural elements: the ox yoke, the smell of coal, the smell of bateys.

In Cuba, Polo's popularity skyrocketed. Spectators' numbers at his concerts exceeded expectations.

Concert in Holguín:

In the year 2002 he played a master concert at the city of Holguín, where many more people attended than event planners ever thought would.

Visited Countries
He has visited Colombia five times, France on two occasions; he has performed in Portugal, Belgium, the Netherlands, Italy, México, Ecuador, and Costa Rica too. He shared the stage with artists as Rubén Blades, Andy Montañez, Margarita Francisco, Cesária Évora, Cándido Fabré, Francisco Repilado (Compay Segundo), Eliades Ochoa, Adalberto Álvarez, Danny Rivera, Gilberto Santa Rosa and others.

Death
Polo Montañez died on November 26, 2002, six days after being hospitalized in the Carlos J. Finlay Military Hospital, as a result of a tragic car accident in the Coronela zone near San Cristóbal, Pinar del Río. He was buried in the cemetery of Candelaria, at Artemisa.
The cultural centre in the main square of Viñales, Pinar del Rio, is named in his memory.

Soon after his death the songwriter José Valladares composed a song in honour of Polo entitled "Cazador de Estrellas" (Star Hunter), which was interpreted by various artists such as Pedro Calvo, Paulito FG, Jenny (Los Van Van's vocalist) among others, making a tribute to the unforgettable figure of the Guajiro Natural.

Discography
 Guajiro Natural (2000) - CD Lusafrica 362202
 Guitarra Mía (2002) - CD Lusafrica 362502
 Memoria (2004) - CD Lusafrica 462222
 El Guajiro (2005) - DVD Lusafrica 462438, 2005
 Cuestión de Suerte (2006)

His greatest hit in his career was the song "Un montón de estrellas", included on his albums Guajiro Natural and Memoria, demonstrating his influence and love for everything that touched his heart. It achieved great success throughout Latin America.

External links
Obituary from canandiannetworkoncuba.ca
Tribute from cuba-junky.com
 Música de Polo Montañez / Polo Montañez's Music
 Entrevistas / Interviews: Polo Montañez: Un montón de música
 Polo of the Mountains and from Beyond the Grave
 Agrupación Polo Montañez presenta nuevo disco (Article published at Radio Guamá
  Entrevista con Polo / Interview with Polo

1955 births
2002 deaths
20th-century Cuban male singers
Road incident deaths in Cuba
Cuban songwriters
Male songwriters
Latin music songwriters